HMS A5 was an early Royal Navy submarine. She was a member of Group Two of the first British  of submarines. Like all members of her class, she was built at Vickers Barrow-in-Furness.

Design and construction
The A-class was designed by Vickers as an improvement on the previous American designed Holland-class submarines, and were the first class of British-designed submarines. Four submarines, –, were ordered as part of the 1902–1903 construction programme for the Royal Navy, with a further nine (A5–) ordered under the 1903–1904 programme. The design of the submarines was revised between the prototype boat, A1, and the other three submarines of the first order, and again for the submarines of the 1903–04 programme, with this batch being fitted with a second torpedo tube.

Displacement was about  surfaced and  submerged. Armament was two 18 inch (45.7 cm) torpedo tubes in the ship's bow. Four torpedoes were carried.

A5 was laid down at Vicker's Barrow-in-Furness shipyard in 1903, was launched on 3 March 1904 and completed on 11 February 1905.

Service history
Immediately after commissioning she and her tender  travelled to Queenstown, (now Cobh) Ireland. On 16 February 1905 at 10:05 whilst tied up alongside Hazard an explosion occurred on board, with a second explosion about 30 minutes later. Five of the crew were killed by the explosion. The captain, Lieutenant H J G Good, and the other four crew members survived.

An enquiry into the accident concluded that petrol fumes had been ignited by an electrical spark, with the second explosion caused by smouldering debris from the first event.

She was returned to Barrow-in-Furness the following month for repairs and returned to service in the Home Fleet in October. She was used for training until paid off for disposal in December 1915 and was finally broken up in Portsmouth in 1920.

Memorial
The Irish Naval Service donated a granite block with a brass plaque giving details of the A5 tragedy, and this was unveiled in March 2000.

On 13 February 2005 there was a ceremony to mark the centenary of the accident.

References

External links
 HMS A5 (Forgotten Submariners) Lost at Cobh  
 HMS A-5 Roll of Honour
 'Submarine Losses 1902 to present day' - Royal Navy Submarine Museum 

 

1904 ships
A-class submarines (1903)
Ships built in Barrow-in-Furness
British submarine accidents
Royal Navy ship names